Federmann is a surname of German origin. Notable people with the surname include:

Michael Federmann (born 1943), Israeli businessman and billionaire
Nikolaus Federmann (c. 1505-1542), German adventurer and conquistador

See also
Federman

Surnames of German origin